James Yate Johnson (1820, in Kendal, Westmorland – 2 February 1900, in Funchal) was an English naturalist.

Johnson lived in Madeira from around 1851, studied marine fish, crustacea, sea anemones and sponges and terrestrial spiders, flowering plants and mosses. He collected specimens for other naturalists; for instance,  George Busk, who in 1859 wrote "Zoophytology: On some Madeiran Polyzoa." Collected by J. Yates Johnson, Esq. in the Quarterly Journal of Microscopical Science, vol. 7, pp. 65–67. He discovered Halargyreus johnsonii and Melanocetus johnsonii during his time in Madeira.

Johnson explored the São Vicente Caves after being informed of their existence by locals on Madeira in 1885. The caves were opened to the public on 1 October 1996, being one of the first caves of volcanic origins to be opened to the public in Portugal.

He was the son of John Henry Johnson and Ann Yate, also brother of John Henry Johnson (patent attorney).

Works
Partial list
1863 Descriptions of five new species of fishes obtained at Madeira. Proceedings of the Zoological Society of London 1863 (33): 36-46, pl. VII
1866. Description of Trachichthys darwini, a new species of berycoid fish from Madeira. Proc. zool. Soc. Lond. : 311-315.
1867. Description of a new genus and a new species of macrurous decapod crustaceans, belonging to the Penaeidae, discovered at Madeira. Proc. zool. Soc. Lond. 1867, pp. 895–901. – describes the genus Funchalia
1880. 
1899. Notes on some Sponges belonging to the Clionidae obtained at Madeira. Journal of the Royal Microscopical Society 1899:461-463, pl.

References

Biographical Etymology of Marine Organism

English zoologists
English botanists
English naturalists
1900 deaths
1820 births
People from Funchal